Japanese naval armaments supplement programmes include:

1st Naval Armaments Supplement Programme (Japan, 1931)
2nd Naval Armaments Supplement Programme (Japan, 1934)
3rd Naval Armaments Supplement Programme (Japan, 1937)
4th Naval Armaments Supplement Programme (Japan, 1939)
Temporal Naval Armaments Supplement Programme (Japan, 1940)
Additional Naval Armaments Supplement Programme (Japan, 1941)
Rapid Naval Armaments Supplement Programme (Japan, 1941)
Modified 5th Naval Armaments Supplement Programme (Japan, 1942)
Wartime Naval Armaments Supplement Programme (Japan, 1944)

Imperial Japanese Navy
Naval history of Japan